In mathematics, fuzzy sets (a.k.a. uncertain sets) are sets whose elements have degrees of membership. Fuzzy sets were introduced independently by Lotfi A. Zadeh in 1965 as an extension of the classical notion of set.
At the same time,  defined a more general kind of structure called an L-relation, which he studied in an abstract algebraic context. Fuzzy relations, which are now used throughout fuzzy mathematics and have applications in areas such as linguistics , decision-making , and clustering , are special cases of L-relations when L is the unit interval [0, 1].

In classical set theory, the membership of elements in a set is assessed in binary terms according to a bivalent condition—an element either belongs or does not belong to the set. By contrast, fuzzy set theory permits the gradual assessment of the membership of elements in a set; this is described with the aid of a membership function valued in the real unit interval [0, 1]. Fuzzy sets generalize classical sets, since the indicator functions (aka characteristic functions) of classical sets are special cases of the membership functions of fuzzy sets, if the latter only takes values 0 or 1. In fuzzy set theory, classical bivalent sets are usually called crisp sets. The fuzzy set theory can be used in a wide range of domains in which information is incomplete or imprecise, such as bioinformatics.

Definition

A fuzzy set is a pair  where  is a set (often required to be non-empty) and  a membership function. 
The function  is called the membership function of the fuzzy set .

For a finite set  the fuzzy set  is often denoted by 

Let . Then  is called 
 not included in the fuzzy set  if  (no member), 
 fully included if  (full member), 
 partially included if 

Crisp sets related to a fuzzy set
For any fuzzy set  and  the following crisp sets are defined:
  is called its α-cut (aka α-level set) 
  is called its strong α-cut (aka strong α-level set) 
  is called its support 
  is called its core (or sometimes kernel ).

Note that some authors understand "kernel" in a different way; see below.

Other definitions
 A fuzzy set  is empty iff (if and only if)

 A fuzzy set  is included in a fuzzy set  iff

 For any fuzzy set , any element  that satisfies
 
is called a crossover point.

 The level set of A is the set of all levels  representing distinct cuts. It is the image of :

 For a fuzzy set , its height is given by

where  denotes the supremum, which exists because  is non-empty and bounded above by 1. If U is finite, we can simply replace the supremum by the maximum.

 A fuzzy set  is said to be normalized iff

In the finite case, where the supremum is a maximum, this means that at least one element of the fuzzy set has full membership. A non-empty fuzzy set  may be normalized with result  by dividing the membership function of the fuzzy set by its height:

Besides similarities this differs from the usual normalization in that the normalizing constant is not a sum.

 For fuzzy sets  of real numbers (U ⊆ ℝ) with bounded support, the width is defined as

In the case when  is a finite set, or more generally a closed set, the width is just

In general, this can be defined given any measure on U, for instance by integration (e.g.

 A real fuzzy set  (U ⊆ ℝ) is said to be convex (in the fuzzy sense, not to be confused with a crisp convex set), iff
.
 Without loss of generality, we may take x ≤ y, which gives the equivalent formulation
.
 This definition can be extended to one for a general topological space U: we say the fuzzy set  is convex when, for any subset Z of U, the condition  

 holds, where  denotes the boundary of Z and  denotes the image of a set X (here ) under a function f (here ).

Fuzzy set operations

Although the complement of a fuzzy set has a single most common definition, the other main operations, union and intersection, do have some ambiguity.
.
 Let t be a t-norm, and s the corresponding s-norm (aka t-conorm). Given a pair of fuzzy sets , their intersection  is defined by:
,
and their union  is defined by:
.

By the definition of the t-norm, we see that the union and intersection are commutative, monotonic, associative, and have both a null and an identity element. For the intersection, these are ∅ and U, respectively, while for the union, these are reversed. However, the union of a fuzzy set and its complement may not result in the full universe U, and the intersection of them may not give the empty set ∅. Since the intersection and union are associative, it is natural to define the intersection and union of a finite family of fuzzy sets recursively.

 If the standard negator  is replaced by another strong negator, the fuzzy set difference may be generalized by

 The triple of fuzzy intersection, union and complement form a De Morgan Triplet. That is, De Morgan's laws extend to this triple.
Examples for fuzzy intersection/union pairs with standard negator can be derived from samples provided in the article about t-norms.

The fuzzy intersection is not idempotent in general, because the standard t-norm  is the only one which has this property. Indeed, if the arithmetic multiplication is used as the t-norm, the resulting fuzzy intersection operation is not idempotent. That is, iteratively taking the intersection of a fuzzy set with itself is not trivial. It instead defines the m-th power of a fuzzy set, which can be canonically generalized for non-integer exponents in the following way:

The case of exponent two is special enough to be given a name.
 For any fuzzy set  the concentration  is defined

Taking , we have  and 

 Given fuzzy sets , the fuzzy set difference , also denoted , may be defined straightforwardly via the membership function:

which means , e. g.:

Another proposal for a set difference could be: 

 Proposals for symmetric fuzzy set differences have been made by Dubois and Prade (1980), either by taking the absolute value, giving

Axioms for definition of generalized symmetric differences analogous to those for t-norms, t-conorms, and negators have been proposed by Vemur et al. (2014) with predecessors by Alsina et al. (2005) and Bedregal et al. (2009).

 In contrast to crisp sets, averaging operations can also be defined for fuzzy sets.

Disjoint fuzzy sets
In contrast to the general ambiguity of intersection and union operations, there is clearness for disjoint fuzzy sets:
Two fuzzy sets  are disjoint iff

which is equivalent to
 
and also equivalent to 

We keep in mind that / is a t/s-norm pair, and any other will work here as well.

Fuzzy sets are disjoint if and only if their supports are disjoint according to the standard definition for crisp sets.

For disjoint fuzzy sets  any intersection will give ∅, and any union will give the same result, which is denoted as
 
with its membership function given by

Note that only one of both summands is greater than zero.

For disjoint fuzzy sets  the following holds true:

This can be generalized to finite families of fuzzy sets as follows:
Given a family  of fuzzy sets with index set I (e.g. I = {1,2,3,...,n}). This family is (pairwise) disjoint iff

A family of fuzzy sets  is disjoint, iff the family of underlying supports  is disjoint in the standard sense for families of crisp sets.

Independent of the t/s-norm pair, intersection of a disjoint family of fuzzy sets will give ∅ again, while the union has no ambiguity:
 
with its membership function given by

Again only one of the summands is greater than zero.

For disjoint families of fuzzy sets  the following holds true:

Scalar cardinality
For a fuzzy set  with finite support  (i.e. a "finite fuzzy set"), its cardinality (aka scalar cardinality or sigma-count) is given by
.
In the case that U itself is a finite set, the relative cardinality is given by 
.
This can be generalized for the divisor to be a non-empty fuzzy set: For fuzzy sets  with G ≠ ∅, we can define the relative cardinality by:
,
which looks very similar to the expression for conditional probability.
Note:
  here.
 The result may depend on the specific intersection (t-norm) chosen. 
 For  the result is unambiguous and resembles the prior definition.

Distance and similarity
For any fuzzy set  the membership function  can be regarded as a family . The latter is a metric space with several metrics  known. A metric can be derived from a norm (vector norm)  via
.
For instance, if  is finite, i.e. , such a metric may be defined by: 
For infinite , the maximum can be replaced by a supremum. 
Because fuzzy sets are unambiguously defined by their membership function, this metric can be used to measure distances between fuzzy sets on the same universe:
,
which becomes in the above sample:
.
Again for infinite  the maximum must be replaced by a supremum.

Similarity measures (here denoted by ) may then be derived from the distance, e.g. after a proposal by Koczy:
 if  is finite,  else, 
or after Williams and Steele:
 if  is finite,  else

Another definition for interval valued (rather 'fuzzy') similarity measures  is provided by Beg and Ashraf as well.

L-fuzzy sets
Sometimes, more general variants of the notion of fuzzy set are used, with membership functions taking values in a (fixed or variable) algebra or structure  of a given kind; usually it is required that  be at least a poset or lattice. These are usually called L-fuzzy sets, to distinguish them from those valued over the unit interval. The usual membership functions with values in [0, 1] are then called [0, 1]-valued membership functions. These kinds of generalizations were first considered in 1967 by Joseph Goguen, who was a student of Zadeh. A classical corollary may be indicating truth and membership values by {f, t} instead of {0, 1}.

An extension of fuzzy sets has been provided by Atanassov. An intuitionistic fuzzy set (IFS)  is characterized by two functions:
1.  – degree of membership of x
2.  – degree of non-membership of x

This resembles a situation like some person denoted by  voting 
 for a proposal :, 
 against it:, 
 or abstain from voting:.
After all, we have a percentage of approvals, a percentage of denials, and a percentage of abstentions.

For this situation, special "intuitive fuzzy" negators, t- and s-norms can be defined.  With  and by combining both functions to  this situation resembles a special kind of L-fuzzy sets.

Once more, this has been expanded by defining picture fuzzy sets (PFS) as follows: A PFS A is characterized by three functions mapping U to [0, 1]: , "degree of positive membership", "degree of neutral membership", and "degree of negative membership" respectively and additional condition 
This expands the voting sample above by an additional possibility of "refusal of voting".

With  and special "picture fuzzy" negators, t- and s-norms this resembles just another type of L-fuzzy sets.

Neutrosophic fuzzy sets

The concept of IFS has been extended into two major models. The two extensions of IFS are neutrosophic fuzzy sets and Pythagorean fuzzy sets.

Neutrosophic fuzzy sets were introduced by Smarandache in 1998. Like IFS, neutrosophic fuzzy sets have the previous two functions: one for membership  and another for non-membership . The major difference is that neutrosophic fuzzy sets have one more function: for indeterminate . This value indicates that the degree of undecidedness that the entity x belongs to the set. This concept of having indeterminate  value can be particularly useful when one cannot be very confident on the membership or non-membership values for item x. In summary, neutrosophic fuzzy sets are associated with the following functions:

1. —degree of membership of x
2. —degree of non-membership of x
3. —degree of indeterminate value of x

Pythagorean fuzzy sets
The other extension of IFS is what is known as Pythagorean fuzzy sets. Pythagorean fuzzy sets are more flexible than IFSs. IFSs are based on the constraint , which can be considered as too restrictive in some occasions. This is why Yager proposed the concept of Pythagorean fuzzy sets. Such sets satisfy the constraint , which is reminiscent of the Pythagorean theorem. However, the less restrictive condition of  may be suitable in more domains.

Fuzzy logic 

As an extension of the case of multi-valued logic, valuations of propositional variables into a set of membership degrees can be thought of as membership functions mapping predicates into fuzzy sets (or more formally, into an ordered set of fuzzy pairs, called a fuzzy relation). With these valuations, many-valued logic can be extended to allow for fuzzy premises from which graded conclusions may be drawn.

This extension is sometimes called "fuzzy logic in the narrow sense" as opposed to "fuzzy logic in the wider sense," which originated in the engineering fields of automated control and knowledge engineering, and which encompasses many topics involving fuzzy sets and "approximated reasoning."

Industrial applications of fuzzy sets in the context of "fuzzy logic in the wider sense" can be found at fuzzy logic.

Fuzzy number and only number 

A fuzzy number is a fuzzy set that satisfies all the following conditions:
 A is normalised;
 A is a convex set;
 ;
 The membership function  is at least segmentally continuous.

If these conditions are not satisfied, then A is not a fuzzy number. The core of this fuzzy number is a singleton; its location is:
 

The core of this fuzzy interval is a crisp interval with:

.

Fuzzy numbers can be likened to the funfair game "guess your weight," where someone guesses the contestant's weight, with closer guesses being more correct, and where the guesser "wins" if he or she guesses near enough to the contestant's weight, with the actual weight being completely correct (mapping to 1 by the membership function).

The kernel  of a fuzzy interval  is defined as the 'inner' part, without the 'outbound' parts where the membership value is constant ad infinitum. In other words, the smallest subset of  where  is constant outside of it, is defined as the kernel.

However, there are other concepts of fuzzy numbers and intervals as some authors do not insist on convexity.

Fuzzy categories
The use of set membership as a key component of category theory can be generalized to fuzzy sets. This approach, which began in 1968 shortly after the introduction of fuzzy set theory, led to the development of Goguen categories in the 21st century. In these categories, rather than using two valued set membership, more general intervals are used, and may be lattices as in L-fuzzy sets.

Fuzzy relation equation 

The fuzzy relation equation is an equation of the form , where A and B are fuzzy sets, R is a fuzzy relation, and  stands for the composition of A with R .

Entropy
A measure d of fuzziness for fuzzy sets of universe  should fulfill the following conditions for all :
 if  is a crisp set: 
 has a unique maximum iff 

which means that B is "crisper" than A.
   
In this case  is called the entropy of the fuzzy set A.

For finite  the entropy of a fuzzy set  is given by
,

or just

where  is Shannon's function (natural entropy function)

The physical interpretation of k is the Boltzmann constant kB.

Let  be a fuzzy set with a continuous membership function (fuzzy variable). Then 

and its entropy is

Extensions
There are many mathematical constructions similar to or more general than fuzzy sets. Since fuzzy sets were introduced in 1965, many new mathematical constructions and theories treating imprecision, inexactness, ambiguity, and uncertainty have been developed. Some of these constructions and theories are extensions of fuzzy set theory, while others try to mathematically model imprecision and uncertainty in a different way (Deschrijver and Kerre, 2003).

See also

 Alternative set theory
 Defuzzification
 Fuzzy concept
 Fuzzy mathematics
 Fuzzy set operations
 Fuzzy subalgebra
 Interval finite element
 Linear partial information
 Multiset
 Neuro-fuzzy
 Rough fuzzy hybridization
 Rough set
 Sørensen similarity index
 Type-2 fuzzy sets and systems
 Uncertainty

References

Bibliography 
 Alkhazaleh, S. and Salleh, A.R. Fuzzy Soft Multiset Theory, Abstract and Applied Analysis, 2012, article ID 350600, 20 p.
 Atanassov, K. T. (1983) Intuitionistic fuzzy sets, VII ITKR's Session, Sofia (deposited in Central Sci.-Technical Library of Bulg. Acad. of Sci., 1697/84) (in Bulgarian) 
 Atanassov, K. (1986) Intuitionistic Fuzzy Sets, Fuzzy Sets and Systems, v. 20, No. 1, pp. 87–96
 Baruah, Hemanta K. (2011) The Theory of Fuzzy Sets: Beliefs and Realities, International Journal of Energy, Information and Communications, Vol, 2, Issue 2, 1 – 22. 
 Baruah, Hemanta K. (2012) An Introduction to the Theory of Imprecise Sets: the Mathematics of Partial Presence, International Journal of Computational and Mathematical Sciences, Vol. 2, No. 2, 110 – 124.
 
 Blizard, W.D. (1989) Real-valued Multisets and Fuzzy Sets, Fuzzy Sets and Systems, v. 33, pp. 77–97 
 Brown, J.G. (1971) A Note on Fuzzy Sets, Information and Control, v. 18, pp. 32–39 
 Brutoczki Kornelia: Fuzzy Logic (Diploma) – Although this script has a lot of oddities and intracies due to its incompleteness, it may be used a template for exercise in removing these issues.
 Burgin, M. Theory of Named Sets as a Foundational Basis for Mathematics, in Structures in Mathematical Theories, San Sebastian, 1990, pp.  417–420
 Burgin M. and Chunihin, A. (1997) Named Sets in the Analysis of Uncertainty, in Methodological and Theoretical Problems of Mathematics and Information Sciences, Kiev, pp.  72–85
 Gianpiero Cattaneo and Davide Ciucci, "Heyting Wajsberg Algebras as an Abstract Environment Linking Fuzzy and Rough Sets" in J.J. Alpigini et al. (Eds.): RSCTC 2002, LNAI 2475, pp. 77–84, 2002. 
 Chamorro-Martínez, J. et al.: A discussion on fuzzy cardinality and quantification. Some applications in image processing, SciVerse ScienceDirect: Fuzzy Sets and Systems 257 (2014) 85–101, 30 May 2013
 Chapin, E.W. (1974) Set-valued Set Theory, I, Notre Dame J. Formal Logic, v. 15, pp. 619–634
 Chapin, E.W. (1975) Set-valued Set Theory, II, Notre Dame J. Formal Logic, v. 16, pp. 255–267
 Chris Cornelis, Martine De Cock and Etienne E. Kerre, [Intuitionistic fuzzy rough sets: at the crossroads of imperfect knowledge], Expert Systems, v. 20, issue 5, pp. 260–270, 2003
 Cornelis, C., Deschrijver, C., and Kerre, E. E. (2004) Implication in intuitionistic and interval-valued fuzzy set theory: construction, classification, application, International Journal of Approximate Reasoning, v. 35, pp. 55–95
 
 Demirci, M. (1999) Genuine Sets, Fuzzy Sets and Systems, v. 105, pp. 377–384 
 
 
 Feng F. Generalized Rough Fuzzy Sets Based on Soft Sets, Soft Computing, July 2010, Volume 14, Issue 9, pp 899–911
 Gentilhomme, Y. (1968) Les ensembles flous en linguistique, Cahiers Linguistique Theoretique Appliqee, 5, pp. 47–63 
 Gogen, J.A. (1967) L-fuzzy Sets, Journal Math. Analysis Appl., v. 18, pp. 145–174
 .  preprint..
 Grattan-Guinness, I. (1975) Fuzzy membership mapped onto interval and many-valued quantities. Z. Math. Logik. Grundladen Math. 22, pp. 149–160.
 Grzymala-Busse, J. Learning from examples based on rough multisets, in Proceedings of the 2nd International Symposium on Methodologies for Intelligent Systems, Charlotte, NC, USA, 1987, pp. 325–332 
 Gylys, R. P. (1994) Quantal sets and sheaves over quantales, Liet. Matem. Rink., v. 34, No. 1, pp. 9–31.
 
 Jahn, K. U. (1975) Intervall-wertige Mengen, Math.Nach. 68, pp. 115–132
 Kaufmann, Arnold. Introduction to the theory of fuzzy subsets. Vol. 2. Academic Pr, 1975.
 
 
 
 Lake, J. (1976) Sets, fuzzy sets, multisets and functions, J. London Math. Soc., II Ser., v. 12, pp. 323–326 
 Meng, D., Zhang, X. and Qin, K. Soft rough fuzzy sets and soft fuzzy rough sets, 'Computers & Mathematics with Applications', v. 62, issue 12, 2011, pp. 4635–4645
 Miyamoto, S. Fuzzy Multisets and their Generalizations, in 'Multiset Processing', LNCS 2235, pp. 225–235, 2001
 Molodtsov, O. (1999) Soft set theory – first results, Computers & Mathematics with Applications, v. 37, No. 4/5, pp. 19–31
 Moore, R.E. Interval Analysis, New York, Prentice-Hall, 1966
 Nakamura, A. (1988) Fuzzy rough sets, 'Notes on Multiple-valued Logic in Japan', v. 9, pp. 1–8 
 Narinyani, A.S. Underdetermined Sets – A new datatype for knowledge representation, Preprint 232, Project VOSTOK, issue 4, Novosibirsk, Computing Center, USSR Academy of Sciences, 1980
 Pedrycz, W. Shadowed sets: representing and processing fuzzy sets, IEEE Transactions on System, Man, and Cybernetics, Part B, 28, 103–109, 1998.
 Radecki, T. Level Fuzzy Sets, 'Journal of Cybernetics', Volume 7, Issue 3–4, 1977 
 Radzikowska, A.M. and Etienne E. Kerre, E.E. On L-Fuzzy Rough Sets, Artificial Intelligence and Soft Computing – ICAISC 2004, 7th International Conference, Zakopane, Poland, June 7–11, 2004, Proceedings; 01/2004 
 
 Ramakrishnan, T.V., and Sabu Sebastian (2010) 'A study on multi-fuzzy sets', Int. J. Appl. Math. 23, 713–721.
 Sabu Sebastian and  Ramakrishnan, T. V.(2010) Multi-fuzzy sets, Int. Math. Forum 50, 2471–2476.
 Sabu Sebastian and  Ramakrishnan, T. V.(2011) Multi-fuzzy sets: an extension of fuzzy sets, Fuzzy Inf.Eng. 1, 35–43.
 Sabu Sebastian and  Ramakrishnan, T. V.(2011) Multi-fuzzy extensions of functions, Advance in Adaptive Data Analysis 3, 339–350.
 Sabu Sebastian and  Ramakrishnan, T. V.(2011) Multi-fuzzy extension of crisp functions using bridge functions, Ann. Fuzzy Math. Inform. 2 (1), 1–8
 Sambuc, R. Fonctions φ-floues: Application a l'aide au diagnostic en pathologie thyroidienne, Ph.D. Thesis Univ. Marseille, France, 1975.
 Seising, Rudolf: The Fuzzification of Systems. The Genesis of Fuzzy Set Theory and Its Initial Applications—Developments up to the 1970s (Studies in Fuzziness and Soft Computing, Vol. 216) Berlin, New York, [et al.]: Springer 2007.
 Smith, N.J.J. (2004) Vagueness and blurry sets, 'J. of Phil. Logic', 33, pp. 165–235 
 Werro, Nicolas: Fuzzy Classification of Online Customers, University of Fribourg, Switzerland, 2008, Chapter 2 
 Yager, R. R. (1986) On the Theory of Bags, International Journal of General Systems, v. 13, pp. 23–37 
 Yao, Y.Y., Combination of rough and fuzzy sets based on α-level sets, in: Rough Sets and Data Mining: Analysis for Imprecise Data, Lin, T.Y. and Cercone, N. (Eds.), Kluwer Academic Publishers, Boston, pp. 301–321, 1997.
 Y. Y. Yao, A comparative study of fuzzy sets and rough sets, Information Sciences, v. 109, Issue 1–4, 1998, pp. 227 – 242 
 Zadeh, L. (1975) The concept of a linguistic variable and its application to approximate reasoning–I, Inform. Sci., v. 8, pp. 199–249
 

Fuzzy logic
Systems of set theory
Iranian inventions
Azerbaijani inventions